Mount Swinford is a peak 2.75 nautical miles (5 km) west-northwest of Mount Harker in Saint Johns Range, Victoria Land. Named by Advisory Committee on Antarctic Names (US-ACAN) for Lieutenant Commander Harold D. Swinford, U.S. Navy (CEC), who served with the Navy Nuclear Power Unit at McMurdo Station, wintering over there in 1963 and 1968.

Mountains of Victoria Land
Scott Coast